In carpentry, architecture, and shipbuilding, a compass is a curved circular form. A compass plane is a plane that is convex, length-ways, on the underside, for smoothing the concave faces of curved woodwork. A compass saw is a narrow-bladed saw that cuts a curve. A compass timber is a curved (or crooked) timber, sometimes used in shipbuilding. A compass brick is a curved brick. A compass wall is a curved wall. A compass window is a circular bay window (or oriel window).

A surveyor's compass (or circumferentor) is a measuring instrument used in surveying horizontal angles.

References 

Woodworking